James "J. C." Hassenauer (born September 15, 1995) is an American football center for the Pittsburgh Steelers of the National Football League (NFL). He played college football at Alabama.

Professional career

Atlanta Falcons
After playing four years at Alabama, Hassenauer was signed by the Atlanta Falcons as an undrafted free agent on April 30, 2018. He was waived on September 1 and signed to the practice squad the next day, where he spent most of the season.

Birmingham Iron
After the season ended, Hassenauer signed with the Birmingham Iron of the Alliance of American Football, where he played eight games.

Pittsburgh Steelers
On April 5, 2019, Hassenauer signed with the Pittsburgh Steelers, but was waived on August 31. On November 20, he was signed to the Steelers' practice squad, and was promoted to the active roster on December 24.

On December 2, 2020, Hassenauer made his first NFL start in a 19–14 win over the Baltimore Ravens.

Hassenauer signed a one-year contract extension with the Steelers on March 8, 2021. He was placed on injured reserve on November 27, 2021. He was activated on December 25.

References

External links
Pittsburgh Steelers bio
Alabama Crimson Tide bio

1995 births
Living people
American football centers
Alabama Crimson Tide football players
Atlanta Falcons players
Birmingham Iron players
People from Woodbury, Minnesota
Pittsburgh Steelers players
Players of American football from Minnesota
Sportspeople from the Minneapolis–Saint Paul metropolitan area